Thompson v Park [1944] KB 408 is an English law case, concerning licenses in land.

Facts
Mr. Thompson, the school's headmaster, wanted an injunction for Mr. Park to leave his school, after Mr. Park had forced his way back into the premises which they had amalgamated as a joint venture together at Broughton Hall, Eccleshall, Staffordshire. Park had a class of 25 pupils before relations broke down, and Thompson had revoked the license. Park countered that he had been denied of his investment.

Judgment
Goddard LJ granted the injunction because of the behavior Park demonstrated.

Not followed in
Verrall v Great Yarmouth BC [1981] QB 202; EWCA

Distinguished in
Luganda v Service Hotels Ltd [1969] 2 Ch 209; EWCA

See also

English land law
English tort law

References

English land case law
Court of Appeal (England and Wales) cases
1944 in British law
1944 in case law